Balderas is a surname. Notable people with the surname include:

Carlos Balderas (born 1996), American boxer
Justin Balderas (born 1988), United States Marine Corps 2006-2014,  2021 Economic Development 40 Under 40 
Eduardo Balderas (1907–1989), Mexican translator
Gustavo Adolfo González Balderas (born 1959), Mexican politician 
Hector Balderas (born 1973), American lawyer
Mark Balderas (born 1959), Mexican keyboard player
Ricardo Balderas (born 1993), Mexican soccer player
Sindey Balderas (born 1976), Mexican footballer

See also
Balderas metro station, a metro station in Mexico City
Balderas (Mexico City Metrobús), a BRT station in Mexico City
"Metro Balderas" (song), by Rockdrigo González